The 1990 Atlanta Braves season was the team's 25th season in Atlanta, the 115th in franchise history as a member of the National League and the 120th season overall. The Braves went 65–97, en route to their sixth-place finish in the NL West, 26 games behind the World Champion Cincinnati Reds, and ending up with the worst record that year.  On June 23, Bobby Cox replaced Russ Nixon as the team's manager, a job Cox would hold for the next two decades.

Offseason
 November 20, 1989: Mark Eichhorn was released by the Atlanta Braves. 
 December 15, 1989: Gerald Perry and Jim LeMasters (minors) were traded by the Braves to the Kansas City Royals for Charlie Leibrandt and Rick Luecken.
 December 17, 1989: Ricky Trlicek was traded by the Braves to the Toronto Blue Jays for Ernie Whitt and Kevin Batiste.

Regular season
 July 4, 1990: Ron Gant had 6 RBIs in one game against the New York Mets.
 David Justice won the National League Rookie of the Year Award.

Opening Day starters

Season standings

Record vs. opponents

Notable transactions
 April 30, 1990: Sergio Valdez was selected off waivers from the Braves by the Cleveland Indians.
 May 2, 1990: Greg Tubbs was traded by the Braves to the Pittsburgh Pirates for Rico Rossy.
 July 12, 1990: Derek Lilliquist was traded by the Braves to the San Diego Padres for Mark Grant.
 July 23, 1990: Marvin Freeman was traded by the Philadelphia Phillies to the Braves for Joe Boever.
 August 3, 1990: Dale Murphy was traded by the Braves with a player to be named later to the Philadelphia Phillies for players to be named later and Jeff Parrett. The Braves sent Tommy Greene (August 9, 1990) to the Phillies to complete the trade. The Phillies sent Jim Vatcher (August 9, 1990) and Víctor Rosario (September 4, 1990) to the Braves to complete the trade.
 August 16, 1990: Billy Taylor was signed as a free agent by the Braves.

Draft picks
 June 4, 1990: 1990 Major League Baseball Draft
Chipper Jones was drafted by the Braves in the 1st round.
Joe Ayrault was drafted by the Braves in the 5th round.

Roster

Player stats

Batting

Starters by position
Note: Pos = Position; G = Games played; AB = At bats; H = Hits; Avg. = Batting average; HR = Home runs; RBI = Runs batted in

Other batters
Note: G = Games played; AB = At bats; H = Hits; Avg. = Batting average; HR = Home runs; RBI = Runs batted in

Pitching

Starting pitchers
Note: G = Games pitched; IP = Innings pitched; W = Wins; L = Losses; ERA = Earned run average; SO = Strikeouts

Other pitchers
Note: G = Games pitched; IP = Innings pitched; W = Wins; L = Losses; ERA = Earned run average; SO = Strikeouts

Relief pitchers
Note: G = Games pitched; W = Wins; L = Losses; SV = Saves; ERA = Earned run average; SO = Strikeouts

Award winners
 David Justice, Player of the Month, August
 David Justice, National League Rookie of the Year Award

1990 Major League Baseball All-Star Game
 Greg Olson, catcher

Farm system

References

 1990 Atlanta Braves team page at Baseball Reference
 Atlanta Braves on Baseball Almanac

Atlanta Braves seasons
Atlanta Braves season
Atlanta Braves